Donald Andrew Novello (born January 1, 1943) is an American actor, comedian, writer, singer, film director and producer. He is best known for his work on NBC's Saturday Night Live from 1978 to 1980, and again from 1985 to 1986, often as the character Father Guido Sarducci. He appeared as Sarducci in many subsequent television shows, including Married... with Children, Blossom, It's Garry Shandling's Show, Unhappily Ever After, Square Pegs, and The Colbert Report, and in the 1980 documentary film Gilda Live. He is also the voice of Vincenzo "Vinny" Santorini in the franchise of Atlantis: The Lost Empire.

Early life
Novello was born in Ashtabula, Ohio, the son of Eleanor Eileen (née Finnerty), a nurse, and Augustine Joseph Novello, a physician. He is of Italian and Irish descent.

The family moved to Lorain, Ohio, when Don was a young boy. In 1961, he graduated from Lorain High School. He subsequently enrolled at the University of Dayton and graduated in 1964. In 1965, he graduated with a Bachelor of Foreign Trade degree from the American Graduate School of International Management (since renamed the Thunderbird School of Global Management, now part of Arizona State University).

Career
In the late 1960s, Novello worked as an advertising copywriter for Leo Burnett in Chicago.

Novello created the Father Guido Sarducci character in 1973 after finding a monsignor's outfit for $7.50 at a St. Vincent de Paul thrift shop. Adding sunglasses, a broom mustache, cigarette and a thick Italian accent, Sarducci became popular in a San Francisco nightclub. Sarducci appeared on San Francisco Channel 20's Chicken Little Comedy Show, and comic David Steinberg was watching. Steinberg hired Novello as a writer for a TV show that never aired, but he also introduced Novello to Tommy and Dick Smothers, and they hired Novello, too. Novello performed on The Smothers Brothers Show in 1975, appearing as Sarducci. He also was with Pat Paulsen during Paulsen's "Presidential Campaign Tour" in the mid-70s as his "Campaign Manager."

In the 1970s, Novello started to write letters to famous people under the pen name of Lazlo Toth (after Laszlo Toth, a deranged man who vandalized Michelangelo's Pietà in Rome). The letters, written to suggest a serious but misinformed and obtuse correspondent, were designed to tweak the noses of politicians and corporations. Many of them received serious responses; Novello sometimes continued the charade correspondence at length, with humorous results. The letters and responses were published in the books The Lazlo Letters, Citizen Lazlo!, and From Bush to Bush: The Lazlo Toth Letters.

The Lazlo Letters, Novello's first book of stilted letters to celebrities, caught the attention of Lorne Michaels, producer of Saturday Night Live. Novello was hired as a writer for the show's third season in 1977-1978 where he remained through the fifth season, and returned as a writer in the eleventh season. He also appeared numerous times on the show in the Father Guido Sarducci character.

In 1980, under the name of Father Guido Sarducci, he sang lead vocals on the Warner Bros. Records release "I Won't Be Twisting This Christmas"/"Parco MacArthur" (WBS49627). Novello co-wrote the first tune with M. Davich, and the second tune is an Italian language cover of "MacArthur Park", the Jimmy Webb song, in an arrangement similar to that recorded by Richard Harris.

Novello made newspapers around the world when he visited the Vatican in 1981 wearing the Father Guido Sarducci costume and, while taking photographs for a magazine article in an area where photography was prohibited, was arrested by the Swiss Guards along with his photographer (Paul Solomon), and eventually charged with "impersonating a priest". The charges were later dropped, and Solomon managed to protect the film from confiscation.

In his stage show in Las Vegas and Reno with the Smothers Brothers, Sarducci rolled a wheelchair with a dummy in the robes of a cardinal. In the act, Sarducci explained he was the assistant of 108-year-old "Cardinal Dario Fungi."

For a brief period in 1982, Novello was a producer on SCTV, a Toronto-based comedy show starring Martin Short, Joe Flaherty, John Candy, Eugene Levy, Dave Thomas, Rick Moranis, Andrea Martin and Catherine O'Hara. He was installed by NBC as one of a series of producers for the show's fourth season, and produced a total of nine episodes.

In 1983, Novello had a cameo as Father Sarducci in the video for Rodney Dangerfield's comedy rap song "Rappin' Rodney" which was heavily played on MTV.

In 1984 Novello wrote The Blade, a high school yearbook parody in which the students are represented by sheep. Novello co-wrote the unfilmed script for Noble Rot with John Belushi. He also narrated Faerie Tale Theatre's third-season episode Pinocchio with Paul Reubens as the titular puppet. Also in 1984, Novello appeared in the music video for the Jefferson Starship song "No Way Out".

In 1989, Novello co-starred in the anthology film New York Stories in the Francis Ford Coppola-directed segment, Life Without Zoe. In his 2 1/2 star review of the movie, Roger Ebert cited Novello for giving "the most engaging performance in the movie."

In 1990, Novello portrayed "Dominic Abbandando" in the film The Godfather Part III. Abbandando appears with speaking lines in the first scene as public relations and media coordinator for Don Michael Corleone. Most notable is when he slaps down a news reporter with the challenge: "You think you know better than the Pope?" Novello appears in many other scenes as well, shadowing George Hamilton, and in the climactic scene on the steps of the Palermo opera house, Teatro Massimo.

In 2001, he lent his voice to the character Vincenzo "Vinny" Santorini in the Disney animated film Atlantis: The Lost Empire, and subsequently in the direct-to-video sequel Atlantis: Milo's Return. In 2003, he filed papers to enter the 2003 California recall election, but failed to collect enough valid signatures to qualify for the ballot.

In 2005, after the death of Pope John Paul II, Novello, as Father Guido Sarducci, reprised his former SNL role as "Special Vatican Reporter" for Air America Radio host (and fellow Saturday Night Live alumnus) Al Franken. He continued this role until the election of Pope Benedict XVI. In 2006, he portrayed the role of Galileo on the podcast "The Radio Adventures of Dr. Floyd".

He portrayed Pope Pius XII in the 2009 short film All in the Bunker.

On June 23, 2010, he appeared on The Colbert Report as Father Guido Sarducci.

On October 30, 2010, he gave the benediction at the Rally to Restore Sanity and/or Fear hosted by Jon Stewart and Stephen Colbert.

American recording artist Guthrie Thomas credited Don Novello as "the best performer in the room" when Novello appeared as Father Guido Sarducci on one of Thomas' albums in a recording studio full of famous performers.

Personal life
Novello resides in San Anselmo, California. He has one brother, Joseph "Joe" Novello, and one sister, Eileen.  His former sister-in-law Dr. Antonia Novello M.D. served as Surgeon General of the United States from 1990 to 1993.  His niece is film producer Holly Wiersma (Wonderland, Billionaire Boys Club).

Selected acting credits
Saturday Night Live (1978–1980, 1985–1986) (TV) - Father Guido Sarducci
Gilda Live (1980) - Father Guido Sarducci
Square Pegs (1982) (TV) - Father Guido Sarducci
Mr. Mike's Mondo Video (1979) - Men in Film Room (voice, uncredited)
Become an Artist (1982) - Father Guido Sarducci
Head Office (1985) - Sal
Father Guido Sarducci Goes to College (1985) - Father Guido Sarducci
It's Garry Shandling's Show (1986) (TV) - Father Guido Sarducci
Tucker: The Man and His Dream (1988) - Stan
New York Stories (1989) - Hector (segment "Life without Zoe")
The Spirit of '76 (1990) - Translator
The Godfather Part III (1990) - Dominic Abbandando
PBS Great Performances La Pastorela: The Shepherd's Tale (1991) - Father Guido Sarducci
Teenage Bonnie and Klepto Clyde (1993) - Sanchez
Blossom (1993) - Father Guido Sarducci
One Night Stand (1995) - Warren Miller
Casper (1995) - Father Guido Sarducci
Married... with Children (1995) (TV) - Father Guido Sarducci
Jack (1996) - Bartender
Touch (1997) - Father Navaroli
Just the Ticket (1999) - Tony
The Adventures of Rocky and Bullwinkle (2000) - Fruit Vendor Twins
Just One Night (2000) - Italian Drifter
Nothing Sacred (2000) - Caterer
Atlantis: The Lost Empire (2001) - Vincenzo 'Vinny' Santorini (voice)
Atlantis: Milo's Return (2003) - Vincenzo 'Vinny' Santorini (voice)
Factory Girl (2006) - Mort Silvers
The Colbert Report (2010) (TV) - Father Guido Sarducci
Twixt (2011) - Melvin
Palo Alto (2013) - Mr. Wilson

Writing credits
The Smothers Brothers Show (1975) (TV)
Van Dyke and Company (1976) (TV)
Saturday Night Live (1978–1986) (TV)
Things We Did Last Summer (1978) (TV)
Gilda Live (with Gilda Radner, Anne Beatts, Lorne Michaels, Michael O'Donoghue, Rosie Shuster, Marilyn Suzanne Miller, Paul Shaffer and Alan Zweibel) (1980)
SCTV (1982) (TV)
Noble Rot (with John Belushi) (1982) (unproduced)
A Man Called Sporacaione (1982) (unproduced)
Blondes vs. Brunettes (with Lisa Medway) (1984)  (TV)
Father Guido Sarducci Goes To College (1985) (VHS)
Our Planet Tonight (1987) (TV)

Bibliography
The Lazlo Letters (1977) 
The Blade: Shellville High School Yearbook (1984)
Citizen Lazlo!: The Lazlo Letters Vol. 2 (1992) 
From Bush to Bush: The Lazlo Toth Letters (2003)

Albums
Father Guido Sarducci Live at St. Douglas Convent (1980)
Breakfast in Heaven (1986) as Father Guido Sarducci
Everybody's Free to Wear Camouflage (2000) (CD Single) written by; Cat McLean, Don Novello and Narada Michael Walden, which was a top 20 hit in the UK. Performed as Father Guido Sarducci
One Hundred Bulbs on the Christmas Tree Party (2006) as Father Guido Sarducci

Appeared on the compilations Holidays in Dementia (1995) and A Classic Rock Christmas (2002).
He made guest appearances on the Handsome Boy Modeling School albums So... How's Your Girl? (1999) and White People (2004).

References

External links

1943 births
American male comedians
American male film actors
American male television actors
American television writers
American male television writers
American people of Irish descent
American writers of Italian descent
Living people
People from Ashtabula, Ohio
People from San Anselmo, California
Thunderbird School of Global Management alumni
American sketch comedians
Comedians from California
Comedians from Ohio
Screenwriters from California
Screenwriters from Ohio
Screenwriters from Arizona